Mohammed Al-Baqawi (born 12 July 1995) is a Saudi Arabian professional footballer who plays as a right back for Al-Fayha.

Club career
Al-Baqawi started his career at the youth team of Al-Tai. Al-Baqawi joined the youth team Al-Hilal on 15 July 2013. On 18 June 2017, Al-Baqawi joined Al-Fayha on a one-year loan. He returned to Al-Hilal following the conclusion of his loan and was made part of the squad for the 2018–2019 season. On 2 February 2019, he joined Al-Shabab in a swap plus cash deal which saw Hattan Bahebri join Al-Hilal. On 29 January 2020, he joined Al-Fayha on a six-month loan from Al-Shabab. On 9 October 2020, Al-Baqawi signed a three-year contract with Al-Fayha.

Honours
Al-Fayha
King Cup: 2021–22
MS League runner-up: 2020–21

References

External links
 
 

Living people
1995 births
People from Ha'il Province
Association football fullbacks
Saudi Arabian footballers
Saudi Arabia youth international footballers
Al-Tai FC players
Al Hilal SFC players
Al-Fayha FC players
Al-Shabab FC (Riyadh) players
Saudi Professional League players
Saudi First Division League players